This is a list of inventors from the Russian Federation, Soviet Union, Russian Empire, Tsardom of Russia and Grand Duchy of Moscow, including both ethnic Russians and people of other ethnicities.

This list also includes those who were born in Russia or its predecessor states but later emigrated, and those who were born elsewhere but immigrated to the country or worked there for a considerable time, (producing inventions on Russian soil).

For Russian inventions in chronological order, see the Timeline of Russian inventions and technology records.

Alphabetical list

A

B

C

D

E

F

G

H

I

J

K

L

M

N

O

P

R

S

T

U

V

W

Y

Z

See also
 List of Russian scientists
 Russian culture
 Timeline of Russian inventions and technology records

References

Inventors
Lists of inventors
Inventors